Louis Nicolas Marie Bernard Davout, (Clermont-Ferrand, 24 March 1877 - Saint-Gaudens, 1 March 1958) was the 4th Duc d'Auerstaedt from 1904 to his death.

He is the son of Léopold Davout (1829–1904), 3rd Duc d'Auerstaedt from 1864 to his death, and Alice de Voize (1845–1935).

On 20 February 1902, in Paris, he married Hélène Eugénie Françoise Marie Étignard de la Faulotte (Paris, 10 September 1880 - Bellozanne (Bellozane is a part of Brémontier-Merval), 24 January 1946), and had issue, fourteen children (five sons and nine daughters).

He was mayor of Brémontier-Merval (Seine-Inférieure, Upper Normandy) from 1928 to 1945, after his father-in-law Henri Étignard de La Faulotte, mayor from 1881 to 1928.

Ancestry

Bibliography 
 Almanach de Gotha : volume II (part III Families), 185e édition, 2001, London, Boydell & Brewer, 1000 pages, 16 cm, « Auerstedt (House of d’Avout) » (pages 35–43).
  Vicomte d’Avout (Jacques d’Avout), Les d’Avout : étude généalogique d’une famille d’ancienne chevalerie du duché de Bourgogne, Dijon, imprimerie Darantière, M CM LII (1952),  86 pages, 31 cm, page 71 for « Louis-Nicolas-Marie-Bernard, 4e duc d’Auerstaedt ».

Notes

1877 births
1958 deaths
Dukes of Auerstaedt